The Ministry of Public Service is a government ministry, responsible for parastatals (state-owned enterprises) in Zimbabwe. Among other agencies, it oversees the Zimbabwean Public Service Commission and the National Social Security Authority (NSSA).

Around 2014 the Ministry of Public Service was merged with the Ministry of Labour and Social Welfare (aka Ministry of Labour, Manpower Planning, and Social Welfare), creating the new Ministry of Public Service, Labour and Social Welfare.

Ministerial staff
In 2009, the incumbent minister was Elphas Mukonoweshuro and the deputy minister was Andrew Langa.

References

Government of Zimbabwe
Public service ministries